Oliver Double (born 22 April 1965) is a British stand-up comedian, author and academic. Since 1999, he has taught comic and popular performance at the University of Kent. His current roles at the university are Reader in Drama and Theatre, and Head of Comedy and Popular Performance.

Career 
Double worked as a circuit comedian and founded the Last Laugh comedy club in Sheffield. He continues to perform in his one-person shows Saint Pancreas and Break a Leg and in a monthly comedy club called Funny Rabbit.

He has written books on the subject including 1997's Stand Up! and 2012's Britain Had Talent as well as book chapters and articles about stand-up comedy, alternative comedy, variety theatre and vaudeville

Double contributed to the creation of the British Stand-Up Comedy Archive (BSUCA) at Kent University's Templeman Library and he produced a monthly podcast about BSUCA called A History of Comedy in Several Objects.

He has appeared on TV programmes and documentaries discussing stand-up comedy, including BBC's Imagine and Horizon. He has also appeared on numerous comedy podcasts including The Alexei Sayle Podcast where he discussed Bertolt Brecht and Book Shambles where he discussed the history alternative comedy with Josie Long and Robin Ince.

Double teaches practical performance including stand-up comedy based on research and many of his students have become professional comedians.

Books
 Stand-Up! On Being a Comedian (1997, Methuen Drama) 
 Getting the Joke: The Inner Workings of Stand-Up Comedy (2004, Bloomsbury) 
 Britain Had Talent: A History of Variety Theatre (2012, Palgrave Macmillan) 
 Alternative Comedy: 1979 and the Reinvention of British Stand-Up (2020, Bloomsbury)

References

External links
 Oliver Double at University of Kent
 British Standup Comedy Archive (BSUCA)
 
 

Living people
1965 births
English male comedians
English podcasters
People associated with the University of Kent